The Northwest Earth Institute is a nonprofit organization based in Portland, Oregon. Northwest Earth Institute was started in 1993 by native Oregonians; Jeanne and Dick Roy, and it currently develops and implements programs designed to motivate individuals and organizations to take action toward a sustainable future. Their most successful program is a series of ten self-facilitated discussion courses to be used by small groups that address various topics related to the environment and sustainable living.

History 
Northwest Earth Institute was founded in 1993 by Dick and Jeanne Roy with $45,000 in start-up grants and thirteen volunteers with the goal of "taking earth-centered programs into mainstream workplaces." Prior to Northwest Earth Institute, Dick had worked as a corporate lawyer since 1970 and Jeanne as an activist on air quality and solid waste issues. In 1993, Dick resigned from his job as a lawyer to volunteer full-time with Jeanne.

Deep Ecology was the first implemented program and included a discussion course and manual on the topic of deep ecology. The institute also started offering a Home Eco-Party Program and the Oregon High School Earth Club Program. The Northwest Earth Institute discontinued the Earth Club Program due to a lack of funding.

As of December 2014, over 160,000 people have participated in NWEI discussion courses throughout North America.

Courses 
Northwest Earth Institute discussion courses publishes ten different discussion courses, which are:
 Seeing Systems: Peace, Justice & Sustainability (published April 2014)
Change by Degrees: Addressing the Climate Challenge
Choices for Sustainable Living
Menu for the Future
Voluntary Simplicity
Discovering a Sense of Place
Reconnecting with Earth
Sustainable Systems at Work
 Hungry for Change: Food, Ethics, and Sustainability
 A World of Health: Connecting People, Place, and Planet

Partners and affiliated organizations 
Arkansas Earth Institute
Be the Change Alliance
Canadian Earth Institute
Catamount Earth Institute
The Cloud Institute for Sustainability
Colorado Mountain College
Corvallis Sustainability Coalition
Coulee Partners for Sustainability
Earth Institute of West Michigan
Garden State Earth Institute
Global Awareness Local Action (Granite Earth Institute)
Great Lakes Earth Institute
Illinois Green Economy Network
Jefferson County Earth Institute
Local Action Network
North American Council for Staff, Program, and Organizational Development (NCSPOD)
Northern Virginia Simplicity Matters Earth Institute
Rocky Mountain Earth Institute
Simplicity Matters Earth Institute
Simply Living
South Durham Green Neighbors
Sustain Vanderbilt University
Unitarian Universalist Ministry for Earth (UUMFE)
Utah Society for Environmental Engineers
Western North Carolina Alliance

EcoChallenge 
Every October, NWEI challenges people across the world to choose one action to reduce their environmental impact and stick with it for two weeks. Individuals and teams choose a category—water, trash, energy, food, or transportation.

In 2009, the Northwest Earth Institute held its inaugural EcoChallenge, and the event has grown since then. The EcoChallenge is open to people from around the world who would like to make a commitment to living more sustainably. Its mission is to help people connect with their communities and take action. The EcoChallenge has garnered recent attention, most notably in higher education, as university professors have increasingly incorporated the event into their curricula, and corporations such as Ecova's EcoChallenge team, have grown their involvement to over 250 employees.

References

Environmental organizations based in Oregon
Organizations established in 1993
Organizations based in Portland, Oregon
1993 establishments in Oregon